Kline  may refer to:

 Kline (surname)

Places 
 Klinë, a.k.a. Klina, in Kosovo

United States:
 Kline, Colorado 
 Kline, Iowa, in Des Moines County, Iowa
 Kline, Louisiana, in Ouachita Parish, Louisiana
 Kline, Pennsylvania, in Clarion County, Pennsylvania
 Kline Township, Pennsylvania
 Kline, South Carolina
 Kline, Washington, in Lincoln County, Washington
 Kline, West Virginia

Other 
 USS Kline (APD-120), ex-DE-687 
 Kline, a.k.a. klinai, ancient furniture item

See also 
 Klein (disambiguation)
 Cline (disambiguation)
 Clyne (disambiguation)
 K-line (disambiguation)